The science of value, or value science, is a creation of philosopher Robert S. Hartman, which attempts to formally elucidate value theory using both formal and symbolic logic.

Fundamentals

The fundamental principle, which functions as an axiom, and can be stated in symbolic logic, is that a thing is good insofar as it exemplifies its concept. To put it another way, "a thing is good if it has all its descriptive properties." This means, according to Hartman, that the good thing has a name, that the name has a meaning defined by a set of properties, and that the thing possesses all of the properties in the set. A thing is bad if it does not fulfill its description.  If it doesn't fulfill its definition it is terrible (awful, miserable). A car, by definition, has brakes. A car which accelerates when the brakes are applied is an awful car, since a car by definition must have brakes. A horse, if we called it a car, would be an even worse car, with fewer of the properties of a car.  The name we put on things is very important: it sets the norm for how we judge them.

In practice, the terms "good" and "bad" apply to finite sets of properties, since this is the only case where there is a ratio between the total number of desired properties and the number of such properties possessed by some object being valued. (In the case where the number of properties is countably infinite, the extrinsic dimension of value, the exposition as well as the mere definition of a specific concept is taken into consideration.)

Hartman quantifies this notion by the principle that each property of the thing is worth as much as each other property, depending on the level of abstraction. Hence, if a thing has n properties, each of them—if on the same level of abstraction—is proportionally worth n−1. . In other words, a car having brakes or having a gas cap are weighted equally so far as their value goes, so long as both are a part of one's definition of a "car." Since a gas cap is not normally a part of a car's definition, it would be given no weight.  Headlights could be weighed twice, once or not at all depending on how headlights appear in the description of a car. Given a finite set of n properties, a thing is good if it is perceived to have all of the properties, fair if it has more than n/2 of them, average if n/2 of them, and bad if it has fewer than n/2.

Infinite sets of properties

Hartman goes on to consider infinite sets of properties. Hartman claims that according to a theorem of transfinite mathematics, any collection of material objects is at most denumerably infinite. This is not, in fact, a theorem of mathematics. As this yields a notional cardinality of the continuum, Hartman advises that when setting out to describe a person, a continuum of properties would be most fitting and appropriate to bear in mind. This is the cardinality of intrinsic value in Hartman's system.

Although they play no role in ordinary mathematics, Hartman deploys the notion of aleph number reciprocals, as a sort of infinitesimal proportion. This, he contends goes to zero in the limit as the uncountable cardinals become larger.

Evaluation of Hartman's work

Hartman invented the Hartman Value Profile, which is however not a description of what is valuable, but a test to determine what people regard as valuable.  It measures concept-formation and decision-making capacity.  A Hartman festschrift (Values and Valuation) appeared a few years after his death.  Some critics would claim that most of the articles in it are not by Hartman supporters. Hartman, some critics claim, is out of the mainstream of value philosophy, but he was asked by UNESCO to summarize the state of Value Theory at Mid-Century. Many would dispute the idea that the number of properties of a thing can in any meaningful way be enumerated, but this is something Hartman never said was necessary.  A standard argument against enumeration is that new properties can be defined in terms of old ones.  Adding more features, a critic could object, even if each seems to be a good one, can sometimes lead to the overall value going down. In this way we get over-engineered software or a remote control which has too many buttons on it.  Hartman holds that "the name (that one puts on a concept) sets the norm" so he would rejoin that a "Remote with too many buttons" is a disvalue.

From a mathematician's point of view, much of Hartman's work in The Structure of Value is rather novel and does not use conventional mathematical methodology, nor axiomatic reasoning. However he later employed the mathematics of topological compact, connected Hausdorff spaces, interpreting them as a model for the value-structure of metaphor, in a paper on aesthetics.

Hartman, following Georg Cantor, uses infinite cardinalities. As a stipulated definition, he posits the reciprocals of transfinite cardinal numbers. These, together with the algebraic laws of exponents, enables him to construct what is today known as The Calculus of Values. In his paper "The Measurement of Value," Hartman explain how he calculates the value of such items as Christmas shopping in terms of this calculus.  While inverses of infinite quantities (infinitesimals) exist in certain systems of numbers, such as hyperreal numbers and surreal numbers, these are not reciprocals of cardinal numbers.

Hartman supporters maintain that it is not necessary for properties to be actually enumerated, only that they exist and can correspond bijectively (one-to-one) to the property-names comprising the meaning of the concept. The attributes in the meaning of a concept only "consist" as stipulations; they don't exist.  Questions regarding the existence of a concept belong to ontology.

Intensional attributes can resemble, but are not identical to, the properties perceived by the five senses. Attributes are names of properties. When, even partially, the properties of a thing match the attributes of that thing in the mind of the one making the judgment, the thing will be said to have "value".  When they completely correspond, the thing will be called "good".  These are basic ideas in value science.

Notes

References
 Davis, John William, ed, Value and Valuation: Axiological Studies in Honor of Robert S. Hartman, The University of Tennessee Press, 1972
 Hartman, Robert S., The Structure of Value: Foundations of Scientific Axiology, Southern Illinois University Press, 1967
 Hartman, Robert S., "Application of the Science of Axiology," Ch. IX in Rem B. Edwards and John W. Davis, eds., Forms of Value and Valuation: Theory and Applications. Lanham, Md., University Press of America, 1991
 Hartman, Robert S., Freedom to Live, (Arthur R. Ellis, editor), Atlanta: Rodopi Editions, Value Inquiry Book Series, 1984, reissued 1994
 Hartman, Robert S., "Axiometric Structure of Intrinsic Value", Journal of Value Inquiry (Summer, 1974; v.8, no. 2, pp. 88–101
 Katz, Marvin C., Sciences of Man and Social Ethics, Boston, 1969, esp. pp. 9–45, 101–123.
 Katz, Marvin C., Trends Towards Synthesis in the Philosophy of Robert S. Hartman,   Muskegon: Axiopress (142 pages 2004).

External links
 Hartman Institute
  Axiometrics International, Incorporated--30 years of applied research
 Center for Applied AxioMetrics
 How intangible values can actually be measured
 Value Insights-What is Value Science?

Axiology